The 2006 BC Lions season was the 49th season for the team in the Canadian Football League and their 53rd overall. The Lions finished in first place in the West Division for a third consecutive season with a 13–5 record and won the 94th Grey Cup over the Montreal Alouettes. Lions quarterback Dave Dickenson was named the game's Most Valuable Player after completing 18 of 29 passes for 184 yards and rushing for 53 yards on six carries. Placekicker Paul McCallum tied a Grey Cup record by kicking six field goals en route to being named the Grey Cup's Most Valuable Canadian. The Lions won their fifth Grey Cup championship in franchise history and first since 2000 when they also defeated the Alouettes.

During the regular season, the Lions were dominant, led by slotback Geroy Simon who caught 105 passes for a club record 1856 yards and 15 touchdowns. Simon was named the league's Most Outstanding Player, becoming the fifth BC Lions player to win the award. Defensive end Brent Johnson was named the league's Most Outstanding Canadian and Most Outstanding Defensive Player, defensive tackle Aaron Hunt was named the league's Most Outstanding Rookie, and offensive tackle Rob Murphy was named the league's Most Outstanding Offensive Lineman. Defensive back Mark Washington was awarded the CFLPA's Outstanding Community Service Award and head coach Wally Buono won the Annis Stukus Trophy as the CFL's Coach of the Year, making it the third time he won the award. The only CFL major trophy not won by the Lions was the CFL's Most Outstanding Special Teams Award, won by Calgary Stampeders kicker Sandro DeAngelis. The Lions had 10 Western All-Stars and a league leading seven Western All-Stars.

Offseason

CFL draft

Preseason

 Games played with white uniforms.

Regular season

Season standings

Season schedule

 Games played with colour uniforms.
 Games played with white uniforms.
 Games played with alternate uniforms.

Player stats

Passing

Rushing

Receiving

Team

Coaching staff

Awards and records
 Wally Buono, – CFL's Scotiabank Coach of the Year
 Aaron Hunt (DT), – CFL's Most Outstanding Rookie Award
 Brent Johnson (DE), – CFL's Most Outstanding Canadian Award
  Brent Johnson (DE), – CFL's Most Outstanding Defensive Player Award
 Rob Murphy (OG), -CFL's Most Outstanding Offensive Lineman Award
 Geroy Simon (SB), – CFL's Most Outstanding Player Award
 Geroy Simon (SB), – Rogers Fans' Choice Award
 Mark Washington (DB), – CFLPA's Most Outstanding Community Service Award

2006 CFL All-Stars
 Korey Banks, Defensive Back
 Otis Floyd, Linebacker
 Brent Johnson, Defensive End
 Barron Miles, Safety
 Rob Murphy, Offensive Tackle
 Geroy Simon, Wide Receiver
 Tyrone Williams, Defensive Tackle

Western Division All-Star Selections
 Korey Banks, Defensive Back
 Otis Floyd, Linebacker
 Aaron Hunt, Defensive Tackle
 Brent Johnson, Defensive End
 Carl Kidd, Special Teams
 Dante Marsh, Cornerback
 Barron Miles, Safety
 Rob Murphy, Offensive Tackle
 Geroy Simon, Wide Receiver
 Tyrone Williams, Defensive Tackle

Playoffs

 Games played with alternate uniforms.

West Final
November 12, 2006
@ BC Place Stadium, Vancouver, BC

Dave Dickenson completed 27-of-37 passes for 274 yards and three touchdowns, as the BC Lions defeated the Saskatchewan Roughriders, 45–18, to score a franchise playoff-record points total and reach the 94th Grey Cup against Montreal. The Lions will play the Montreal Alouettes, who beat the Toronto Argonauts 33–24 in the East Final. BC, who finished first in the West Division for the third straight season, lost the 2004 Grey Cup to Toronto and were downed by Edmonton in the 2005 West Final.

Grey Cup
November 19, 2006
@ Canad Inns Stadium, Winnipeg, MB

Scoring summary
BC Lions (25) – TDs, Ian Smart; FGs Paul McCallum (6); cons., McCallum.

Montreal Alouettes (14) – TDs, Robert Edwards; FGs Damon Duval; cons., Duval; safety touch (2).

First Quarter 
BC—FG McCallum 34-yard field goal 4:49 
BC—FG McCallum 35-yard field goal 12:26 
BC—FG McCallum 24-yard field goal 14:15

Second Quarter 
BC—TD Smart 25-yard run (McCallum convert) 4:12 
MTL—FG Duval 43-yard field goal 13:18 
BC—FG McCallum 30-yard field goal 15:00

Third Quarter 
MTL—Safety McCallum concedes in end zone 8:47 
MTL—TD Edwards 2-yard run (Duval convert) 13:00

Fourth Quarter 
BC—FG McCallum 21-yard field goal 4:17 
BC—FG McCallum 47-yard field goal 6:28 
MTL—Safety McCallum concedes in end zone 13:17

References

BC Lions
BC Lions seasons
Grey Cup championship seasons
2006 in British Columbia